The Laundry SF, or simply The Laundry, is a contemporary art gallery, event space and cafe, founded in 2015 and located in San Francisco’s Mission District. The Laundry curates exhibitions, which includes public programming around civics, fine arts, music, comedy, and live performances. The Laundry hosts a mix of works by emerging and established Bay Area and global artists.

History 
It was founded in the year 2015 by Sara Ahmadian, Andrew Swerdlow, Gianmatteo Costanza and Dan Fredinburg. The name of the gallery was due to the historic nature of the building they occupy. The building was erected in the year 1932, where a French family procured the place during 1940's and opened a French laundry service, being first within the community.

The gallery is also known for its partnership with the restaurant Koomaj Kitchen, for bringing traditional Northern Iranian food to San Francisco. Several scenes from the Netflix documentary, The Social Dilemma were filmed at The Laundry.

Artists

Exhibitions 
 2016 – Art of Dying, VR and AR group exhibition, curators were Lindsay Saunders and Kelly Vicars of Dream Logic.
 2017 – I am an Immigrant, a pop-up exhibition and event.
 2017 – Vanity ll,  
 2018 – Second Chance, was a VR-based a two-hour immersive experience for groups of ten people at a time.
 2019 – Suzy Kellems Dominik and INVISIBLE, We the People, solo exhibition
 2019 – Race, Identity and the New Great American Stories

References

External links 
 The Laundry SF Website

Art galleries established in 2015
Contemporary art galleries in the United States
Art museums and galleries in San Francisco